A penumbral lunar eclipse took place on Friday, November 28, 1947.

Visibility
It was completely visible over Asia, Australia, Pacific, Arctic, and the Americas. It was rising over Asia and Australia and setting over the Americas.

Related lunar eclipses

Lunar year series

Saros cycle 
Lunar Saros series 144, repeating every 18 years and 11 days, has a total of 71 lunar eclipse events including 20 total lunar eclipses.

First Penumbral Lunar Eclipse: 1749 Jul 29

First Partial Lunar Eclipse: 2146 Mar 28

First Total Lunar Eclipse: 2308 Jul 04

First Central Lunar Eclipse: 2362 Aug 06

Greatest Eclipse of the Lunar Saros 144: 2416 Sep 07

Last Central Lunar Eclipse: 2488 Oct 20

Last Total Lunar Eclipse: 2651 Jan 28

Last Partial Lunar Eclipse: 2867 Jun 08

Last Penumbral Lunar Eclipse: 3011 Sep 04

See also
List of lunar eclipses
List of 20th-century lunar eclipses

Notes

External links

1947-11
1947 in science